Aline is a 2021 musical comedy-drama film co-written, directed by and starring Valérie Lemercier. A fictionalized portrayal of the life of Céline Dion, Lemercier plays "Aline Dieu", a Canadian singer who rises to international superstardom.

Lemercier plays Aline at every stage of her life from childhood through to middle age, with her body and face digitally adjusted for age-appropriateness in post-production. However, her singing is performed by French singer Victoria Sio.

Aline had its world premiere on 13 July 2021 at the Cannes Film Festival, and was released in France on 10 November 2021 by Gaumont, and in Canada on 26 November 2021 by Maison 4:3. It received mixed reviews from the critics and earned  four nominations at the 47th Annual César Awards, including Best Film, and with Lemercier winning for Best Actress.

Plot
Anglomard and Sylvette Dieu are working class parents raising 13 children in their household in Quebec, Canada. Aline Dieu, named after a song from Christophe, becomes the 14th and youngest child to be born.

The Dieu family share the same love for music which is passed on to a young, but timid Aline growing up. Realizing that she wants to become a professional singer, Sylvette decides to make Aline’s dream come true by composing her first song with the help of her eldest son. The demo was then sent to Guy-Claude Kamar, a record manager who managed one of the family’s favorite singers, and were asked to see him in his office. Guy-Claude is amazed by Aline’s singing voice and is determined to make her one of the biggest artist in the world.

Aline earns immediate success as a young artist in her home province and gains attention in France. As Aline becomes a young adult, she is forced to take a long break by her manager in order for her image and music to mature. Aline begins to grow romantic feelings for Guy-Claude as she resumes touring, causing Sylvette to have suspicions. After winning a European song contest in Dublin, Aline expresses her feelings to Guy-Claude and the two pursue a private romantic relationship. Their relationship is met with anger by Sylvette due the their age gap and Guy-Claude’s previous relationship status, but comes to terms with it despite that she had threatened to fire him if he pursues.

Aline performs ‘Pour que tu m'aimes encore’ at a talk show and was asked by the host about who the song was about, but decided not to say anything. Guy-Claude proposes to Aline while on tour and they later marry. While the newlyweds try for a baby through IVF, Aline injures her voice while performing ‘All by Myself’ and is forced to not sing or speak for about three months. Aline receives a demo of ‘My Heart Will Go On’ and, although not originally amused, decides to record the song after being convinced by her husband. She then meets Fred, a French makeup artist and designer, and chooses to work with him after a successful performance at a movie awards show. After a series of failed IVF treatments, Aline gives birth to her first son, Junior, and then twin boys years later. Aline deals with the ups and downs of international superstardom and the tabloids while being a wife and a mother of three boys.

Guy-Claude becomes ill with a terminal illness and dies. Aline decides to take a walk through Las Vegas while unrecognized in order to cope with her grief. Fred and others begin to worry about her whereabouts as she is due to perform at a Las Vegas hotel that same night. Aline makes it and performs ‘Ordinaire’.

Cast
 Valérie Lemercier as Aline Dieu (Céline Dion)
 Victoria Sio as Aline's singing voice
 Sylvain Marcel as Guy-Claude Kamar (René Angélil)
 Danielle Fichaud as Sylvette Dieu (Thérèse Dion)
 Roc Lafortune as Anglomard Dieu (Adhémar Dion)
 Antoine Vézina as Jean-Bobin Dieu
 Pascale Desrochers as Pascale Dieu
 Jean-Noël Brouté as Fred
 Sonia Vachon as Martine Lévêque
 Alain Zouvi as Docteur Lablanchette
 Yves Jacques as TV presenter

Release
The film premiered at the 2021 Cannes Film Festival, and had its Canadian premiere in November 2021.

In advance of its Canadian release, the Dion family spoke out against the film, criticizing it for factual inaccuracies and for portraying their family as "a gang of Bougons". The film was approved by Dion's manager; Dion herself has not spoken about it publicly to date, although Lemercier has claimed that Dion's son René-Charles reached out to her to request a private viewing.

Reception

Box office
Aline grossed $667,308 in the United States and Canada and $10.5 million in other territories for a worldwide total of $11.2 million, against a production budget of about $25.3 million.

Critical response
  On Metacritic, the film has a weighted average score of 53 out of 100, based on 24 critics, indicating "mixed or average reviews". On AlloCiné, the film holds an average rating of 4.1/5 based on 35 press reviews.
Kyle Buchanan of The New York Times opined that Lemercier's decision to play the character throughout her life was the strangest aspect of the film:

For Variety, Peter Debruge wrote that "Lemercier wouldn’t dare offend Dion, nor would she dream of giving fans the slightest reason to question their devotion, and so 'Aline' comes off feeling like a faith-based movie, where Dieu (French for 'God') gets the reverential 'lives of the saints' treatment. For those who adjust their expectations accordingly, it’s still an extremely satisfying watch — just one in which the only conflicts are convincing Aline’s parents to accept her love for manager Guy-Claude (Sylvain Marcel), the couple attempting to get pregnant and a tricky period when Aline’s vocal cords nearly give out. Suffice to say, most of the film’s tears are those of joy."

Accolades

References

External links
 
 

Celine Dion
2021 films
2021 comedy-drama films
2021 musicals
Canadian biographical drama films
Canadian comedy-drama films
Canadian musical comedy-drama films
French biographical drama films
French comedy-drama films
French musical comedy-drama films
French-language Canadian films
Quebec films
Films shot in Andalusia
Films shot in Quebec
Films shot in France
Films shot in the Las Vegas Valley
Musical comedy-drama films
Gaumont Film Company films
2020s Canadian films
2020s French films